Stefanie Andrea Marty (born 16 April 1988) is a Swiss retired ice hockey player who currently serves as assistant coach to SC Reinach of the SWHL A. She was a member of the Swiss national team from 2003 until her retirement in 2017. With the Swiss national team, she won bronze medals at the 2014 Olympic Games and the 2012 IIHF Women's World Championship. At the 2010 Olympic Games, Marty scored 9 goals and tied with Meghan Agosta of Team Canada as top goal scorer of the tournament.

Playing career
Marty played youth ice hockey with the local club, EHC Wettingen-Baden. She made her debut in the SWHL A with SC Zug in the 2003–04 season, at age 15, and played the following two seasons with the team. 

She began her collegiate career in the 2007–08 season with the New Hampshire Wildcats of Hockey East of the NCAA Division I. As a freshman with the Wildcats, Marty scored 10 points (3 goals + 7 assists) in 32 games and played in the 2008 NCAA Championship quarterfinals. She transferred to Syracuse University for the 2008–09 season and remained with the Syracuse Orange until her graduation in 2011.

Marty's twin sister, Julia Marty, in an ice hockey defenceman who currently plays with SC Reinach of the SWHL A. With the exception of their sophomore through senior years in college, Stefanie and Julia played together on the same teams for the entirety of Stefanie’s career.

Swiss national team
Prior to the NCAA, she was nominated to be Swiss Hockey Woman of the Year in 2005. Her Swiss team placed eighth in the 2004 World Championship at Halifax. Marty appeared in the 2006 Olympic games in Torino where her team earned seventh place. From 2003–2007, she played for the EV Zug in the Swiss league. The team earned two Swiss Championships in 2004 and 2005 and two Swiss Vice-Championships in 2006 and 2007. At the Vancouver Winter Games, she tied the Olympic record for most goals scored in a single tournament with nine and helped her homeland to a fifth-place finish. In a game against Russia at the 2012 IIHF Women's World Championship, Stefanie Marty scored two goals in a 5–2 victory, as Switzerland advanced to the semifinals.

Syracuse
During the week of 2 October 2009, Marty accumulated three points in Syracuse's 3–3 tie at Boston College. In addition, she scored a goal in a game against the New Hampshire Wildcats, her former team.

Marty was part of all four Syracuse goals in a 4–3 win against Princeton. This occurred during the week of 8 December 2009. She assisted on the game-winning goal.

On 1 October 2010, Marty had two goals in a 4–4 tie vs. Northeastern. The Northeastern team featured her twin sister Julia Marty. It was the first time the sisters had played against each other in their NCAA careers.

Career stats

Olympics

Awards and honors
CHA Offensive Player of the Week, (Week of 12 October 2009)
CHA Offensive Player of the Week, (Week of 13 December 2009)
2010 Second Team All-CHA

See also
List of Olympic medalist families

References

External links

 
 
 
Syracuse biography

1988 births
Living people
Expatriate ice hockey players in Sweden
Ice hockey players at the 2006 Winter Olympics
Ice hockey players at the 2010 Winter Olympics
Ice hockey players at the 2014 Winter Olympics
Linköping HC Dam players
Medalists at the 2014 Winter Olympics
New Hampshire Wildcats women's ice hockey players
Olympic bronze medalists for Switzerland
Olympic ice hockey players of Switzerland
Olympic medalists in ice hockey
Swiss expatriate ice hockey people
Swiss expatriate sportspeople in the United States
Swiss women's ice hockey forwards
Syracuse Orange women's ice hockey players
Swiss twins
Twin sportspeople
Swiss expatriate sportspeople in Sweden
Sportspeople from the canton of Schwyz